Cormoran Strike is a series of crime fiction novels written by British author J. K. Rowling, published under the pseudonym Robert Galbraith. The story chronicles the cases of the fictional British private detective Cormoran Strike and his partner Robin Ellacott. Six novels in the series have so far been published. Rowling stated after the third book that she has plans for at least another ten. The sixth novel, titled The Ink Black Heart, was released on 30 August 2022 by Mulholland Books. On 12 January 2023, Rowling announced the title of the seventh book as The Running Grave.

The first two novels were adapted for BBC One and aired as five episodes in August and September 2017. Career of Evil aired as two episodes in February and March 2018. A fourth series, an adaptation of Lethal White, aired as four episodes in August and September 2020. A fifth series, an adaptation of Troubled Blood, aired as four episodes in December 2022.

Novels

Plot 
In 2010, Cormoran Blue Strike (b. 23 Nov. 1974)—private detective, ex–Royal Military Police Special Investigation Branch investigator and the illegitimate son of famous rock star Jonny Rokeby (the result of an affair with a notorious groupie, Leda Strike)—is broke, and his birth father's business agent is calling in the loan that he gave to Strike to open his agency. Strike lost the lower half of his right leg in an attack in Afghanistan. He had previously studied at Oxford, but left in his second year to join the Army following the death of his mother.

The first novel, The Cuckoo's Calling, begins with Strike being hired by John Bristow, the brother of adopted supermodel Lula Landry, who had fallen from her balcony three months previously. Bristow wants Strike to investigate his sister's supposed suicide. Strike also meets Robin Ellacott (b. 9 Oct. 1984), who has been sent to act as his temporary secretary despite the fact he can barely afford her. Ellacott has just become engaged to her longtime boyfriend, Matthew, with their wedding set to happen later that year. Although Strike only hires her for one week, she turns out to be much more competent (and useful) than he first expects, and they end up extending her stay.

Strike's personal life is complicated. He has just split from his long term partner and fiancée, Charlotte Campbell, who immediately marries another man. He is closest to his half-sister Lucy (his mother's second child), with whom he grew up, though he has seven other half-siblings (the other children of Rokeby) and one half-brother who is the son of his mother and her last husband Jeff Whittaker. Even his relationship with Lucy is somewhat fraught, and Strike finds himself becoming closer to Robin, who has always wanted to be a detective, than he at first feels entirely comfortable with.

Near the first book's end, after solving the Landry case and before Ellacott is ready to leave for a permanent position elsewhere, Strike gives her the gift of a green silk dress she had previously tried on at the Vashti boutique as part of their investigation. This dress is significant to both of them, though its importance is unspoken by each. Finally, the two decide that Ellacott will stay on.

The second book, The Silkworm, begins around eight months after the conclusion of book one. Strike is approached by Leonora Quine with a plea to locate her husband, notorious writer Owen Quine, who has seemingly disappeared without trace. Owen, once hailed as a literary rebel, has struggled for years to recreate the success of his original novel and has fallen out of public favour. Strike discovers that his disappearance coincides with the leak of a manuscript for his latest novel, Bombyx Mori. The London literary community considers Bombyx Mori to be unpublishable: an unpleasant mix of rape, sadomasochism, torture, necrophilia and cannibalism, the hero is eventually tricked and eaten alive by various characters who are thinly veiled caricatures of people in Owen's life whom he considers responsible for the destruction of his career. The investigation soon takes a different and altogether more gruesome turn when Owen is found dead. During the investigation, Ellacott faces personal difficulties as her fiancé's mother dies, and she must make some difficult decisions about the balance between her career and her personal life.

The third novel, Career of Evil, begins with Ellacott receiving a package from a courier, which she discovers contains the severed right leg of a woman. The package is accompanied by a note quoting from the Blue Öyster Cult song Mistress of the Salmon Salt (Quicklime Girl), a tattoo that Strike's mother, a famous groupie and BÖC fan, had above her crotch. Because of that link, Strike told the police that he believed that the package had been sent by someone from his own past with a grudge against him.

Strike and Ellacott work out that the sender of the leg is also responsible for a number of other brutal attacks and reaches public infamy as the Shacklewell Ripper. Strike identifies four potential suspects from his past whom he believes would be capable of such crimes but, as the police want to concentrate on the one Strike believes to be least likely, they set out to investigate the other three. Ellacott informs Strike that she dropped out of university due to trauma from being raped, and the Shacklewell Ripper then stalks and seriously injures Ellacott in an attack. Later, Ellacott makes a decision while investigating one of their suspects that has profound and shocking consequences for their relationship, as Strike fires her and she then heads off to marry her fiancé Matthew. Strike sets a successful trap to catch the Shacklewell Ripper and drives all night to arrive at Ellacott's wedding ceremony at the end of the novel.

The fourth novel, Lethal White, begins right at that point, as Ellacott learns about Strike's capture of the Ripper and that Matthew had deleted Strike's messages to her, which immediately strains their marriage. Ellacott accepts Strike's offer of a salaried partnership in the agency, which becomes very busy due to Strike's new-found fame, but she continues to struggle with PTSD from the rape and the attack by the Ripper. A year later, the agency is hired by a government minister to investigate and stop an attempted blackmail against him, although he will not tell Strike or Ellacott the details of his actions. They find evidence of embezzlement against one of the blackmailers, but then their client dies in an apparent suicide. One of his children then hires Strike to investigate the death, because she believes her stepmother was behind it. Ellacott finds Matthew cheating on her and leaves him, temporarily going to live with her friend detective Vanessa Ekwensi. When Strike figures out the motive for the murder, he and Ellacott take their evidence to the police. While reviewing the state of the case at Scotland Yard, the murderer lures Ellacott into a trap by posing as the now-estranged Matthew. Ellacott successfully stalls the murderer long enough for Strike and the police to realize the situation and intervene. Ellacott moves in with Strike's friends Nick and Ilsa before moving in permanently with a friend of Ilsa's.

The fifth novel begins in August 2013 and ends on 9 October 2014. While visiting his dying aunt Joan, Strike is approached by Anna Phipps, who wants to hire his firm to investigate the disappearance of her mother, Margot Bamborough, a general practitioner in London, almost 40 years previously. As a result of their previous successes, Strike and Ellacott (still a salaried partner) now employ three contract investigators and an office manager. Both are dealing with their own irritations: Strike over his aunt's illness, suicide threats from his ex-fiancée Campbell (now a married mother of two) and the attempts of his half-siblings to get him to attend a party honouring his rock star biological father Johnny Rokeby; Ellacott over Matthew's intransigence in their divorce, her continuing PTSD and her unsettled personal life, brought into clearer focus by her brother and his wife having their first child.  The police's principal suspect in the disappearance was a then unidentified serial killer named Dennis Creed, now incarcerated in Broadmoor.

Phipps gives the agency a one-year contract to go over the case. However, thanks to the large workload at the small firm, it takes several months for them to run down the surviving witnesses and investigators (or their children). During the year, Strike's aunt dies, Matthew grants Ellacott the divorce because his mistress/girlfriend becomes pregnant, and the heavy work schedule combined with a lack of communication about their issues contributes to several personal misunderstandings and disagreements, including the termination of one of the contractors for repeated inappropriate behaviour toward Ellacott. In August 2014, although the firm still has leads to pursue, Phipps and her wife end the contract, but Strike and Ellacott continue to investigate. They abruptly achieve several minor breakthroughs whilst also securing an interview with Creed. Strike induces him to confess to one of the last unsolved murders he was long suspected of, before revealing he has already deduced the identity of Bamborough's real killer. Having tipped off the police about Creed's victim, Ellacott locates and uncovers Bamborough's remains, whilst Strike apprehends her killer. The agency's investigation thus solves two cold cases, and after the partners shelter from the ensuing media storm, they celebrate Ellacott's 30th birthday together.

The sixth novel picks up in the immediate aftermath of the previous. Following Ellacott's birthday festivities, Strike attempts to kiss her. Ellacott pulls away, an instinctual reaction due to past trauma, but Strike mistakes the reaction as possible disgust. The potential budding romance between them is stopped cold and Strike later begins dating another woman. Ellacott is approached by Edie Ledwell, the co-creator of a popular animated series titled The Ink Black Heart. Edie wishes the Strike agency to investigate the continued online harassment directed at her by individual known only as "Anomie," whose online handle originates from a term referring to a lack of usual social or ethical standards. Ellacott declines the case, citing, among other reasons, the fact that the Strike agency does not specialize in cybercrimes. Ledwell is later found murdered by stabbing, her co-creator Josh Blay badly injured but alive. Ellacott and Strike then receive a request to investigate the case made by those at the production company who are planning to turn the franchise into a feature film. They explain that they have already explored all possible normal cyber-investigation avenues and Strike and Ellacott accept the case.

Anomie is the co-creator of Drek's Game, a free fan-created online game based around one of the main characters of The Ink Black Heart. Anomie seals new registrations to the game, but Ellacott manages to gain access via a previously created account. She and Strike then dive deep into the world of the game and those associated with the production of The Ink Black Heart. In the course of their investigation, they discover that the game has been infiltrated by members of The Halvening, a far-right terrorist group which mainly harasses left-leaning women online, often with the goal of trying to drive them to suicide. Although their office is bombed by members of The Halvening, their investigation leads them to believe that it is not, in fact, The Halvening that is responsible for Ledwell's murder. They eventually discover Anomie to be the teenage son of one of those associated with the production and capture him in a violent confrontation in which he threatens to rape and kill Ellacott and seriously injures Strike. Anomie turns out to be a disgruntled fan who was attempting to exert control on the production and was aggravated by the decision to move The Ink Black Heart from YouTube to Netflix and to make a film. As Ellacott visits Strike in the hospital, he reveals that when he had the office remodelled in the aftermath of the bombing, he replaced the logo on the glass of the door so that it now reads "Strike and Ellacott Detective Agency." Having recently broken up with his girlfriend, he is troubled when he learns that Ellacott is now dating a police detective, as he still harbours latent romantic feelings for her.

Characters

Protagonists 

 Cormoran Blue Strike is an ex-SIB investigator, and a veteran of the war in Afghanistan where he lost half his left leg in a bomb attack. He decides to muster out for fear of becoming brainwashed (yet misses the Army occasionally), choosing instead to become a private detective. At the beginning of the series, he has few customers and is sleeping in his office due to debt. His biological father, Jonny Rokeby, is a renowned rock star who had an affair with model and 'super groupie' Leda Strike, which led to Cormoran becoming his illegitimate son; Cormoran has almost no relationship to speak of with his father, apparently meeting just twice. The only one of his half-siblings to whom he is close is Lucy, daughter of his mother and another musician, Rick Fantoni, though even their relationship is at times strained. His childhood was peripatetic, moving around frequently with his mother and her periodic boyfriends, but punctuated by spells of stability, particularly with his maternal aunt and uncle in Cornwall, a place to which he has a deep attachment (his name even has a Cornish origin). He is also in occasional contact with his half-brother Alexander 'Al' Rokeby, who has enjoyed the unperturbed adolescence  and ensuing comforts of the son of a famous rock star. Up until the start of the first novel, Cormoran was in a tempestuous on-again-off-again relationship with socialite Charlotte Campbell for 16 years. Having met at Oxford University, Cormoran left shortly after the start of their liaison for the army because of the traumatic and tragic death of his mother. Strike and Charlotte’s troubled relationship ends in a violent argument just before Robin arrives at his office as a temp. Strike initially hopes his new employee will be gone as soon as possible, but gradually comes to rely on Robin’s intelligence and her natural ability for detective work. Their relationship is complicated; he clearly finds her physically and personally attractive, but is extremely reluctant to admit this even to himself, trying to maintain a professional distance between them. This task becomes progressively harder, exacerbated by the fact that he has a number of unsatisfying relationships following his split from Charlotte. He recognises how much his agency has benefitted from Robin’s work, and is determined to preserve their working relationship. Strike is described as a physically imposing man, at least 6'3" in height, heavily built, though now carrying excess weight. He is hairy, and has dark wiry, curly hair, leading to some calling him 'pubehead'. His nose was twice broken during his military boxing career, then is broken again in the third novel. Although described as being 'not conventionally handsome', he seems to be attractive to a number of different women. He also appears to have prodigious appetites: for food – he is frequently described eating; for alcohol — he appears to be able to drink quite large amounts, and sexual — he describes himself as having an 'uninhibited libido'. He is forced to begin restraining these appetites in the sixth novel as they begin taking a toll on his health. He lives by a simple but strong philosophy — "do the job and do it well." When he sees a group of people protesting the war in Afghanistan, he does not resent them, but has no interest in joining, as he does not regret his service. In regards to investigations, he often takes the view that "motive is for suckers", believing it far more useful to establish means and opportunity.

 Robin Venetia Ellacott Strike's new assistant, originally arriving in his office as a temporary secretary. She was only supposed to work for Strike for a week. She turns out to be much more competent than expected, and he ends up extending her stay. She is originally from Masham in North Yorkshire. She studied Psychology at university, though she dropped out after her second year. She is very intelligent and is seen to possess keen investigative skills, which by turns surprise, intrigue and impress Strike. She is an expert driver, having taken an advanced driving course, and impresses Strike, who is normally prejudiced against being driven by anybody, especially women (he mostly attributes this to his relatives). Between the events of the second and third novels, Strike pays for her to take a criminal investigation course, which she apparently passes with distinction. After that, she progresses to becoming Strike's partner rather than his assistant. She plans to marry her boyfriend Matthew Cunliffe, who has proposed to her as the first novel begins. She initially describes Strike as being extremely unattractive, even calling him 'pubehead'. There are, however, increasing signs as time goes on that she no longer feels this way, and her increasing closeness to Strike causes friction between herself and her fiancé. During the third novel, it is revealed that as a student, she was raped and left for dead by an attacker, the aftermath of which is the reason she dropped out of university. She is thus sensitive towards crimes involving sexual assault, and her pursuit of justice in such cases is generally the main cause of professional tension between herself and Strike. Robin survives two violent encounters with sex offenders during the third novel, and is briefly fired by Strike due to her reckless actions. Matthew then deletes Strike's calls and texts from Robin's phone, stymying Strike's attempts to reconcile and give Robin her job back. Robin discovers this at her wedding reception at the beginning of the fourth novel, and the resulting fallout leads to Robin leaving Matthew a year later. Their divorce drags on for most of the fifth novel, while Robin comes to terms with her now lonely personal life.

Secondary characters
Matthew Cunliffe is Robin's fiancé, and also comes from Masham. He works as an accountant, and has been Robin's only serious boyfriend. He proposes to Robin at the beginning of the first novel. He does not approve of her working for Strike. Initially he considers Strike to be a shady character, but later his objections take other, more personal, forms. Robin briefly splits from Matthew during the events of the third novel after finding out that he cheated on her with his friend, Sarah Shadlock, while at university. However, the couple reconcile, with Robin and Matthew marrying at the novel's conclusion. At the reception, Robin learns that he deleted Strike's post-firing texts to her, which causes a huge fight that disrupts their reception, although they ultimately decide to stay together. However, during the fourth novel, Robin learns that Matthew and Sarah are continuing their affair, which leads her to separate from Matthew and seek a divorce.
 Lucy is Strike's younger half-sister on his mother's side. She craves suburban normality and family stability to make up for their peripatetic childhood, and is seen by Strike (perhaps a little unfairly) as somewhat judgemental. Strike attends her son, Jack's birthday party in the first novel. During the second novel, she hosts a birthday meal for her half-brother. In the fourth novel, Strike has to accompany her middle son, Jack, to the hospital, as she and her husband are overseas. Though he admits to being extremely fond of her, their relationship is sometimes strained. She disagrees with several of his life choices, believing that he should have settled down, married and had children.
 Jonny Rokeby is Strike's famous rock-star father, who has met his son only twice in his lifetime. He only accepted his paternity following a test. He has six other children from three marriages (the first two ended in divorce, one supposedly as a result of Strike's conception) and a relationship with an actress. Throughout most of The Cuckoo's Calling, Strike is in debt to him for a loan and he has hired an agent to try to collect on it. In Troubled Blood Rokeby tries to make contact with Strike, who rejects his efforts, eventually revealing to Robin that the first time they met, when Strike was a child, Rokeby referred to him as an "accident". 
Leda Strike is Strike's late mother, a famous model and a rockstar 'supergroupie'. She died of a heroin overdose when Strike was 20. Strike has always suspected his stepfather, Jeff Whittaker, had something to do with her death, though almost nobody else seems to agree. Leda is also the mother of Lucy (by another famous musician) and a son fathered by Whittaker. Capricious and flighty, Leda received large amounts of money from Rokeby in paternity payments, but always managed to fritter it away, ultimately resulting in further money being placed in a trust fund where she couldn't touch it.
Charlotte Campbell (Ross) is Strike's ex-fiancée. Wealthy and mercurial, she and Strike had a tempestuous on-off relationship for 15 years after first meeting at Oxford, but Strike ends their engagement for good as the events of the first novel begin. She walks out of his life literally at the moment Robin walks into it. She allegedly lied to Strike about being pregnant with his child. She later marries her pre-Strike Oxford boyfriend, Jago Ross, and soon becomes pregnant with twins, although she remains interested in Strike, especially after he becomes famous. He considers her to be a compulsive liar with an insatiable need for drama. She has attempted suicide at least twice.
 Eric Wardle is a detective initially involved in the Lula Landry case. In the third novel, he is the officer in charge of the case of the severed leg. He has grown somewhat close to Strike, continually joshing and sharing information with him. He has to leave the police investigation during the third novel, following the unexpected death of his brother in a hit and run incident, and is replaced by Roy Carver. In the fourth novel, he serves as Strike's main contact to the police.
 Roy Carver is the detective initially in charge of the Landry case in the first novel and a colleague of Eric Wardle. As a result of Strike's investigation, Carver's suicide conclusion is discredited, resulting in an extremely antagonistic relationship with Strike. In the third novel, he is Wardle's replacement in the police investigation of the so-called Ripper attacks. He is extremely hostile towards Strike, warning him not to pursue the case further.
 Richard Anstis is a detective with the Metropolitan Police and a TA officer who was present at the incident that cost Strike his leg. Strike is in fact responsible for saving Anstis's life during that incident, for which Anstis is always aware and grateful, even though their professional relationship is sometimes placed under great strain. Strike considers him a capable investigator but lacking in imagination. He pulls rank to take the lead on the case in the second novel.
 Linda Ellacott is Robin's mother, first appearing in the second novel. She is a generally kind and supportive woman who, Strike notes, her daughter physically resembles. She visits London to care for her daughter, supporting her decision to take a break in her relationship with Matthew. She is concerned by the possible dangers of her daughter's work, and suspicious about the extent of Robin's feelings towards Strike himself. 
 Alexander 'Al' Rokeby is Strike's half-brother on his father's side, and the only member of his father's side of the family with whom he has any discernible contact. He is friendly to Strike and willing to use his star power to help Strike in his investigations. He is well-educated and achieved excellent grades in his International Baccalaureate.
 Shanker is Strike's friend from the times he was living with his mother Leda. Leda picked him up while he was lying bleeding in the gutter after a knife attack. Shanker still leads a life in London's criminal underbelly where he has valuable contacts for Strike. Strike and Shanker, though leading very different lives, are very loyal to each other.
 Nick and Ilsa Herbert are Strike's school friends who appear beginning in the second novel. The couple met due to their mutual friendship with Strike. Nick is a gastroenterologist and the son of a London taxi driver. Ilsa is a lawyer who grew up with Strike in Cornwall; Strike recruits Ilsa to assist one of his clients in the second novel. Strike sometimes crashes round their house, when he wants to avoid unwanted attention from the media. After her marriage breaks up, Robin uses their spare room while flat-hunting.
 Samuel 'Sam' Barclay is a Scottish subcontractor who begins working with the agency in the fourth novel. A former soldier who was investigated and exonerated by Strike during his time in the SIB, Barclay has no formal investigative experience, but Strike considers him to be intelligent and of strong personal conviction. While accepting harsh working hours without much complaint, Barclay also occasionally assists the partners on unusual jobs where Strike's disability limits his effectiveness.

Television adaptation 

In December 2014, it was announced that the novel series would be adapted for television by the BBC. In September 2016, Tom Burke was confirmed as having been cast as Cormoran Strike. Holliday Grainger was cast as Robin Ellacott later in November. Filming of seven hour-long episodes of the Cormoran Strike television series began in November 2016.  The series was picked up by HBO for distribution in the United States and Canada, It premiered on 27 August 2017 on BBC.

References

Book series introduced in 2013
2013 British novels
2014 British novels
2015 British novels
 
Strike, Cormoran
Strike, Cormoran
Strike, Cormoran
Strike, Cormoran
Strike, Cormoran
Strike, Cormoran
Sphere Books books
Strike, Cormoran